Klevshult is a locality situated in Vaggeryd Municipality, Jönköping County, Sweden with 264 inhabitants in 2010.

References 

Populated places in Jönköping County
Populated places in Vaggeryd Municipality